Deni Kozul (born 18 March 1997) is a Slovenian table tennis player.

He represented his country at the 2021 Summer Olympic Games in Tokyo.

References 

1997 births
Living people
Slovenian male table tennis players
Table tennis players at the 2020 Summer Olympics
Olympic table tennis players of Slovenia
20th-century Slovenian people
21st-century Slovenian people